Chevaux De Frise is an unincorporated community in Ritchie County, West Virginia, United States.

The etymology of the name of nearby Chevaux de Frise Run is disputed.

References 

Unincorporated communities in West Virginia
Unincorporated communities in Ritchie County, West Virginia